"Shouting fire in a crowded theater" is a popular analogy for speech or actions whose principal purpose is to create panic, and in particular for speech or actions which may for that reason be thought to be outside the scope of free speech protections. The phrase is a paraphrasing of a dictum, or non-binding statement, from Justice Oliver Wendell Holmes, Jr.'s opinion in the United States Supreme Court case Schenck v. United States in 1919, which held that the defendant's speech in opposition to the draft during World War I was not protected free speech under the First Amendment of the United States Constitution. The case was later partially overturned by Brandenburg v. Ohio in 1969, which limited the scope of banned speech to that which would be directed to and likely to incite imminent lawless action (e.g. a riot).

The paraphrasing differs from Holmes's original wording in that it typically does not include the word falsely, while also adding the word "crowded" to describe the theatre.

Background
In the 19th and early 20th centuries, panics caused by false shouts of "fire" in crowded theaters and other venues were not uncommon. Most notably, the Canonsburg Opera House disaster of 1911 led to 26 deaths, and the 1913 Italian Hall disaster saw 73 people die in the crush that ensued from a false alarm in a crowded banquet hall.

The problem was widespread enough that the person falsely shouting "fire" became a stock character in popular writing, representing an example of foolish or villainous behavior.

Laws were enacted in some jurisdictions to protect the public from such panics, such as the Indianapolis municipal code of 1917, which made it illegal to "[c]ry out a false alarm of 'fire' in any church, public hall, theater, moving picture showroom, or any other building of a similar or different character, while the same is occupied by a public assemblage."

The first known use of the analogy in the context of free speech occurred in the 1918 trial of Eugene V. Debs. Debs was charged with violations of the Espionage Act of 1917 for an anti-war speech he had delivered in Canton, Ohio. In his closing argument, Debs offered as his sole legal defense that his speech was protected by the First Amendment. Federal prosecutor Edwin Wertz then argued in his closing rebuttal:

Historians infer that Oliver Wendell Holmes read Wertz's speech while preparing his opinion in Debs v. United States and adopted the analogy for use in the Schenck case.

The Schenck case

Decision
Holmes, writing for a unanimous Court, ruled that it was a violation of the Espionage Act of 1917 (amended by the Sedition Act of 1918) to distribute flyers opposing the draft during World War I. Holmes argued that this abridgment of free speech was permissible because it presented a "clear and present danger" to the government's recruitment efforts for the war. Holmes wrote:

Legacy
The First Amendment holding in Schenck was later partially overturned by Brandenburg v. Ohio in 1969, in which the Supreme Court held that "the constitutional guarantees of free speech and free press do not permit a State to forbid or proscribe advocacy of the use of force or of law violation except where such advocacy is directed to inciting or producing imminent lawless action and is likely to incite or produce such action."  The test in Brandenburg is the current Supreme Court jurisprudence on the ability of government to punish speech after it occurs. Despite Schenck being limited, the phrase "shouting fire in a crowded theater" has become synonymous with speech that, because of its danger of provoking violence, is not protected by the First Amendment.

Ultimately, whether it is legal in the United States to falsely shout fire in a theater depends on the circumstances in which it is done and the consequences of doing it. The act of shouting fire when there are no reasonable grounds for believing one exists is not in itself a crime, and nor would it be rendered a crime merely by having been carried out inside a theatre, crowded or otherwise. However, if it causes a stampede and someone is killed as a result, then the act could amount to a crime, such as involuntary manslaughter, assuming the other elements of that crime are made out. Similarly, state laws such as Colorado Revised Statute § 18-8-111 classify knowingly "false reporting of an emergency," including false alarms of fire, as a misdemeanour if the occupants of the building are caused to be evacuated or displaced, and a felony if the emergency response results in the serious bodily injury or death of another person. Somewhat more trivially, in some states it is a crime just to knowingly make a false report - or knowingly cause a false report to be made - of an emergency to emergency services. In the statute just cited, for example, it is a crime to knowingly cause "a false alarm of fire" to be transmitted to "any...government agency which deals with emergencies involving danger to life or property." This crime could plausibly be made out where, for instance, in response to the false shout, an innocent bystander calls emergency services to report the fire, and this is found to have been such a foreseeable response to the shouts that the shouter is deemed to have caused the false report to be made.

Criticism

Christopher M. Finan, Executive Director of the National Coalition Against Censorship, writes that Justice Holmes began to doubt his decision due to criticism received from free-speech activists. He also met the legal scholar Zechariah Chafee and discussed his Harvard Law Review article "Freedom of Speech in War Times". According to Finan, Holmes's change of heart influenced his decision to join the minority and dissent in the Abrams v. United States case. Abrams was deported for issuing flyers saying the US should not intervene in the Russian Revolution. Holmes and Brandeis said that "a silly leaflet by an unknown man" should not be considered illegal. Chafee argued in Free Speech in the United States that a better analogy in Schenck might be a man who stands in a theatre and warns the audience that there are not enough fire exits.

In his introductory remarks to a 2006 debate in defense of free speech, writer Christopher Hitchens parodied the Holmes judgment by opening "FIRE! Fire, fire... fire. Now you've heard it", before condemning the famous analogy as "the fatuous verdict of the greatly over-praised Justice Oliver Wendell Holmes." Hitchens argued that the "Yiddish speaking socialists" protesting America's entry into World War I, who were imprisoned by the Court's decision, "were the real fire fighters, were the ones shouting fire when there really  a fire, in a very crowded theatre indeed. And who is to decide?"

Writer Emma Camp has pointed out that Schenk v. United States did not actually address the question of whether or not it is illegal to "shout fire in a crowded theater", since this analogy was simply non-binding dictum used to illustrate Justice Holmes' point.

Historical instances
People have falsely shouted "Fire!" or been misheard in crowded public venues and caused panics on several occasions, such as:
At Mount Morris Theater, Harlem, New York City in September 1884. During the fire scene of "Storm Beaten", someone in the gallery shouted "Fire!" three times. The performance continued and a roundsman and a policeman arrested a young man.
In the Shiloh Baptist Church stampede, Birmingham, Alabama on September 19, 1902. Over 100 people died when someone in the choir yelled, "There's a fight!". "Fight" was misheard as "fire" in a crowded church of approximately 3000 people, causing a panic and crush.
In the Italian Hall disaster, Calumet, Michigan on December 24, 1913. Seventy-three men, women, and children, mostly striking mine workers and their families, were killed in a crush when someone falsely shouted "Fire!" at a crowded Christmas party.
In the Basilica of St. Teresa, Caracas, Venezuela on 9 Apr 1952. 50 people died after someone shouted "Fire!". 40 people were arrested in connection with the crush. 
At Raymond Cinema 3, Mandaluyong, Metro Manila on December 26, 1987. One 13-year-old girl died from internal haemorrhage while many moviegoers, mostly women, were injured due to a crush that began when a man shouted "Sunog!" three times at the packed theater during an evening screening of the Metro Manila Film Festival entry Huwag Mong Buhayin ang Bangkay.

In contrast, during the Brooklyn Theatre fire of December 5, 1876, theatre staff were reluctant to cause a panic by shouting fire and instead pretended that the fire was part of the performance. This delayed the evacuation, leading to a death toll of at least 278.

See also 

Bomb threat
Food fight
False alarm
Hate speech
List of United States Supreme Court cases, volume 395
The Boy Who Cried Wolf
Threatening the president of the United States
Masses Publishing Co. v. Patten (1917)
Whitney v. California, 
Chaplinsky v. New Hampshire, 
Korematsu v. United States 
Terminiello v. Chicago, 
Feiner v. New York, 
Dennis v. United States 
Sacher v. United States  
Hess v. Indiana

References

Sources

Further reading

First Amendment to the United States Constitution
1919 works
American English idioms
Analogy
Illegal speech in the United States
Speech crimes